Laura Valentina Abril Restrepo (born 28 January 1990, La Cumbre) is a Colombian cross-country mountain biker. She was junior world champion in 2008. At the 2012 Summer Olympics, she competed in the Women's cross-country at Hadleigh Farm, but didn't complete the race.

References

1990 births
Living people
Cross-country mountain bikers
Colombian female cyclists
Olympic cyclists of Colombia
Cyclists at the 2012 Summer Olympics
Sportspeople from Valle del Cauca Department
South American Games gold medalists for Colombia
South American Games medalists in cycling
Competitors at the 2010 South American Games
Cyclists at the 2011 Pan American Games
Cyclists at the 2019 Pan American Games
Pan American Games competitors for Colombia
20th-century Colombian women
21st-century Colombian women
Competitors at the 2018 Central American and Caribbean Games